The 12 Hours of Sebring, The Coca-Cola Classic, was the third round of the 1983 IMSA GT Championship and was held at the Sebring International Raceway, on March 19, 1983. Victory overall went to the No. 9 Personalized Autohaus Porsche 934 driven by Wayne Baker, Jim Mullen, and Kees Nierop.

Race results
Class winners in bold.

Class Winners

References

12 Hours of Sebring
12 Hours of Sebring
12 Hours Of Sebring
12 Hours Of Sebring